The Cowboys–Steelers rivalry is a rivalry in the NFL. The Cowboys currently lead the all-time series 17–16. The two teams met in the Super Bowl three times, the most of any two teams. As the Cowboys are in the NFC and the Steelers are in the AFC, they usually only meet once every four regular seasons and occasionally in the preseason. CBS Sports ranked this rivalry No. 2 of the best NFL rivalries of the 1970s.

History

1952–1960: Before the Cowboys
The roots to the Cowboys–Steelers rivalry can be traced several years before the Cowboys played a game, and to another team entirely. Following the 1951 NFL season, New York Yanks owner Ted Collins sold his team back to the NFL due to financial difficulties competing with the New York Giants in the same market, as well as the All-America Football Conference, in which it had played, folding just two years before and putting a severe drain on the team.

Not wanting the team to compete with the Giants in the same market, the NFL decided to move the rights to the franchise to either Dallas or Baltimore. Baltimore had previously been home to an NFL team, the original Baltimore Colts which had come over from the AAFC along with the Cleveland Browns and San Francisco 49ers, but had folded after the 1950 NFL season due to financial difficulties despite strong fan support. Dallas, and the state of Texas in general, was a true expansion market that was untapped, and the NFL owners liked the appeal that Dallas offered due to the aforementioned following of football in the state.

The NFL owners voted 10–1 to award the assets of the Yanks to the Dallas group led by Giles Miller as opposed to the Baltimore group, which became the Dallas Texans. The lone holdout was Steelers founder and owner Art Rooney. Rooney, an Irish Catholic, was more tolerant of African Americans than the other owners (most of whom were Protestant and had their own discrimination towards Catholics) and was concerned about the racism that existed in the Southern United States at the time and the subsequent civil rights movement that would take place later in the decade. Rooney's assumptions would be later proven correct: while the Texans struggled on the field, it also struggled at the gate partly because two of the team's best players, George Taliaferro and Buddy Young, were both black, which made fans in Texas automatically turn away from the team simply because of prejudice.

The Texans folded after the 1952 NFL season and their assets would be sold to Carroll Rosenbloom to form the new Baltimore Colts, which currently play in Indianapolis.

1960–1969: Early years
After the failure of the Texans, the NFL had no plans to return to the state in the foreseeable future. However, in 1959, Lamar Hunt, the son of oil tycoon H. L. Hunt, approached the NFL about putting another expansion team in Dallas. The NFL said no, stating that the league was not expanding at the time. He then approached the Chicago Cardinals about buying the team from owner Violet Bidwill Wolfner, who ultimately decided to keep the team and whose son Bill Bidwill remains the owner (the Cardinals did move to St. Louis, Missouri for the 1960 NFL season; the team currently is based in Phoenix, Arizona; the Cowboys and Cardinals were divisional rivals from 1961–66, and again from 1970–2001). Due to these rebuffs, Hunt formed the American Football League with his own Dallas team, the AFL's incarnation of the Dallas Texans.

In response, the NFL suddenly reversed course and awarded an expansion team to Dallas for the 1960 season that ultimately became the Cowboys. The plan worked: although the Texans were by far the better team on the field and won the 1962 AFL Championship, due to the Cowboys being part of the more-established NFL, the Texans took their AFL Championship north to Kansas City, Missouri, where they remain as the Kansas City Chiefs.

In the meantime, the Cowboys started play in the NFL in 1960. Their first game was against the same Steelers team that voted against putting an NFL team in Dallas eight years earlier, with the Steelers coming away with a 35–28 victory at the Cotton Bowl, en route to an 0–11–1 first season for the Cowboys. The following year, the two teams met again in the season opener at the Cotton Bowl and the results would be different: the young Cowboys beat the veteran-filled Steelers 27–24, the first victory for the Cowboys in franchise history.

The two teams would head in opposite directions the rest of the decade, with the Cowboys competing for the NFL championship in 1966 and 1967 (both losses to the Vince Lombardi-led Green Bay Packers, the latter matchup in the Ice Bowl) while the Steelers would be among the NFL's worst teams, culminating in a 1–13 record in 1969 that saw the team win its season opener against the Detroit Lions, then lose every game afterwards in the first season of Hall of Fame head coach Chuck Noll. The Cowboys defeated the Steelers 10–7 at Pitt Stadium in week 12 of the 1969 season, the final meeting between the clubs before the AFL-NFL merger.

1970–1979: Teams of the 1970s
The Steelers would be moved to the newly formed American Football Conference as a result of the AFL–NFL merger for the 1970 NFL season while the Cowboys would be placed in the National Football Conference. The Cowboys would split the first two Super Bowl matchups of the decade while the Steelers started improving and would eventually become the dynasty of the decade.

Around this time, both teams would have firm identities. Both were strong on defense with the Steelers' famed Steel Curtain defense, called a "Stunt 4–3", while the Cowboys boasted the Doomsday Defense, based around Landry's "Flex" 4–3 defense. On the offensive side of the ball brought key differences, as the Cowboys had Hall of Fame quarterback Roger Staubach and his aerial attack, as well as his reputation for fourth-quarter comebacks, earning him the nickname "Captain Comeback". The Steelers meanwhile, were powered offensively by the running game, led by Hall of Fame running back Franco Harris.

The teams met in September 1972 at Texas Stadium, with the Cowboys prevailing 17–13. The Steelers would go on to win the AFC Central division and qualify for the playoffs for the first time. In the postseason, Pittsburgh defeated the Oakland Raiders 13–7 on Franco Harris' "Immaculate Reception", but lost the AFC championship game to the eventual Super Bowl champion Miami Dolphins 21–17. Dallas qualified for the playoffs as the NFC wildcard team, where they defeated the San Francisco 49ers in the divisional round 30-28, but lost the NFC championship game to their division rivals, the Washington Redskins, 26-3.

The two had their first postseason meeting in Super Bowl X, with both teams vying to tie the Packers and Miami Dolphins for their second Super Bowl Championship. The Steelers won this game, 21–17, after safety Glen Edwards intercepted a Staubach pass in the end zone to seal the victory. The hostility was evident in the third quarter when Steelers kicker Roy Gerela missed his second field goal, a 33-yard attempt. After the miss, Cowboys safety Cliff Harris mockingly patted Gerela on his helmet and thanked him for "helping Dallas out", but was immediately shoved to the ground by Steeler linebacker Jack Lambert. Lambert could have been ejected from the game for defending his teammate, but the officials decided to allow him to remain.

After the Cowboys won Super Bowl XII, the two would meet again in Super Bowl XIII, considered one of the greatest Super Bowls ever played and consisted of a combined 20 players, coaches, and front-office administration that ended up in the Pro Football Hall of Fame, an NFL record. The Steelers would once again come victorious, holding off the Cowboys 35–31. By this point, both teams would have rabid fan bases established nationally due to prominent television exposure.

The two would meet in the regular season in 1979 at Three Rivers Stadium, a 14–3 Steelers victory that many thought would be preview of Super Bowl XIV. While the Steelers did go on to win Super Bowl XIV that season, the Los Angeles Rams crashed the party, having upset the Cowboys in the divisional round of the playoffs 21–19 in Staubach's last game en route to meeting the Steelers in Super Bowl XIV.

1980–1989: Down years
Age eventually caught up to both teams once the 1980s hit, though both remained competitive into the middle of the decade. The highlight of the decade for this rivalry would come in the 1982 season opener at Texas Stadium, when the Steelers ended the Cowboys NFL-record 17-year season-opening winning streak with a 36–28 victory against the Cowboys.

By the middle of the decade, both teams were rebuilding. The 1986 NFL season would be the first year since the 1965 NFL season that both teams missed the playoffs, which would happen for two more years before the Steelers clinched a wild card spot in 1989. During this time, the Steelers, with a mix of aging veterans and younger players, remained competitive in the AFC Central while the wheels fell off completely in Dallas. In 1988, both Tom Landry and Chuck Noll appeared on the cover of Sports Illustrated together, asking if both coaches had lost their touch. Though both teams had young future Hall of Famers in Michael Irvin and Rod Woodson, the Cowboys and Steelers would finish 3–13 and 5–11, respectively, for 1988. New Cowboys owner Jerry Jones fired Landry after the season. Noll would retire just three seasons later after missing the playoffs by just a few games each year after his breakout 1989 wild-card spot and two playoff thrillers, a 26–23 overtime victory in Houston and a 24–23 loss at Denver.

1990–present: Return to prominence
The Cowboys would return to prominence in the 1990s, winning three Super Bowls, while the Steelers would return to AFC Championship contention under head coach Bill Cowher. The rivalry resumed in the 1990s, but unlike the 1970s matchups that were dominated by Pittsburgh, Dallas got the upper hand this time around. The Cowboys swept all four matchups between the two teams in the decade.

The possibility of Cowboys–Steelers III for Super Bowl XXIX existed, as both teams advanced to their respective conference championships. Such a matchup would be a rematch from Week 1 of the regular season, which the Cowboys won 26–9. The Cowboys were the two-time defending Super Bowl champions, while the Steelers behind their "Blitzburgh" defense was the favorite to win the AFC. However, the favored Steelers were upset by the San Diego Chargers 17–13 while the San Francisco 49ers, who had lost in the NFC Championship game the previous two years to the Cowboys, beat the Cowboys 38–28.

Fans would only have to wait another year for Cowboys–Steelers III in the Super Bowl, as both teams advanced to Super Bowl XXX. Like the previous two matchups, the game was close, but this time favored the Cowboys, who won 27–17 after Steelers quarterback Neil O'Donnell threw two interceptions to Cowboys cornerback Larry Brown, who would be named Super Bowl MVP for his efforts.

The Steelers have remained competitive since, winning two more Super Bowls (XL and XLIII) and losing one (XLV), while the Cowboys have not been back to the Super Bowl since Super Bowl XXX and have won only four playoff games from 1996 onward without reaching the NFC Championship.

The teams split the four meetings since, with the Steelers winning in 2004 and 2008, and the Cowboys winning in 2012 and 2016. In the fifth meeting since realignment, 2020, the Steelers regained the upper hand by defeating the Cowboys at AT&T Stadium, 24-19.

Game results

|-
| 
| style="| Steelers  35–28
| Cotton Bowl
| Steelers  1–0
| Cowboys' inaugural season. Cowboys' first game as a franchise.
|-
| rowspan=2|
| style="| Cowboys  27–24
| Cotton Bowl
| Tied  1–1
| rowspan=2|First win for the Cowboys in franchise history.
|-
| style="| Steelers   37–7
| Pitt Stadium
| Steelers  2-1
|-
| rowspan=2|
| style="| Packers  30–28
| Cotton Bowl
| Steelers  3-1
| 
|-
| style="| Cowboys  42–27
| Pitt Stadium
| Steelers  3–2
|
|-
| rowspan=2|
| style="| Steelers  27–21
| Pitt Stadium
| Steelers  4-2
|
|-
| style="| Steelers  24–19
| Cotton Bowl
| Steelers  5–2
|
|-
| rowspan=2|
| style="| Steelers  23–17
| Pitt Stadium
| Steelers  6–2
|
|-
| style="| Cowboys   17–14
| Cotton Bowl
| Steelers  6–3
|
|-
| rowspan=2|
| style="| Steelers  22–13
| Pitt Stadium 
| Steelers  7–3
|
|-
| style="| Cowboys   24–17
| Cotton Bowl
| Steelers  7-4
|
|-
| rowspan=2|
| style="| Cowboys   52–21
| Cotton Bowl
| Steelers  7-5
| rowspan=2|Cowboys lose 1966 NFL Championship Game.
|-
| style="| Cowboys   20–7
| Pitt Stadium
| Steelers  7-6
|-
| 
| style="| Cowboys  24–21
| Pitt Stadium
| Tied  7–7
| Cowboys lose 1967 NFL Championship Game.
|-
| 
| style="| Cowboys   28–7
| Cotton Bowl
| Cowboys  8-7
| 
|-
| 
| style="| Cowboys  10–7
| Pitt Stadium
| Cowboys  9–7
| The final meeting between the clubs before the AFL-NFL merger.
|-

|-
| 
| style="| Cowboys  17–13
| Texas Stadium
| Cowboys  10–7
| First meeting at Texas Stadium.
|-
! 1975 playoffs
! style="| Steelers  21–17
! Orange Bowl
! Cowboys  10–8
! Super Bowl X.
|-
| 
| style="| Steelers  28–13
| Three Rivers Stadium
| Cowboys  10-9
| First meeting at Three Rivers Stadium. Cowboys win Super Bowl XII.
|-
! 1978 playoffs
! style="| Steelers   35–31
! Orange Bowl
! Tied  10–10
! Super Bowl XIII.
|-
| 
| style="| Steelers  14–3
| Three Rivers Stadium
| Steelers  11–10
| Final start in the series for Roger Staubach. Steelers win Super Bowl XIV.
|- 

|-
| 
| style="| Steelers  36–28
| Texas Stadium
| Steelers  12–10
| Final start in the series for Terry Bradshaw
|-
| 
| style="| Cowboys  27–13
| Texas Stadium
| Steelers  12–11
| 
|-
| 
| style="| Steelers  24–21
| Three Rivers Stadium
| Steelers  13–11
| Final game for Tom Landry in this series.
|-

|-
| 
| style="| Cowboys  20–10
| Texas Stadium
| Steelers  13–12
| Final game for Chuck Noll in this series. Only game for Jimmy Johnson in this series.
|-
| 
| style="| Cowboys  26–9
| Three Rivers Stadium
| Tied  13–13
| This game marked Barry Switzer's debut as Cowboys head coach. First game in series for Bill Cowher.
|-
! 1995 playoffs
! style="| Cowboys   27–17
! Sun Devil Stadium
! Cowboys  14–13
! Super Bowl XXX.
|-
| 
| style="| Cowboys  37–7
| Three Rivers Stadium
| Cowboys  15–13
| 
|-

|-
| 
| style="| Steelers  24–20
| Texas Stadium
| Cowboys  15–14
| First start in the series for Ben Roethlisberger. Last game in this series for Bill Cowher.
|-
| 
| style="| Steelers  20–13
| Heinz Field
| Tied  15–15
| First start in the series for Tony Romo. First meeting at Heinz Field. Steelers win Super Bowl XLIII. First game in this series for Mike Tomlin.
|-

|-
| 
| style="| Cowboys  27–24(OT)| AT&T Stadium
| Cowboys  16–15
| First meeting at AT&T Stadium. Final start in the series for Tony Romo.
|-
| 
| style="| Cowboys  35–30| Heinz Field
| Cowboys  17–15
| Cowboys QB Dak Prescott's first start in the rivalry. Tony Romo's final NFL season.
|-

|-
| 
| style="| Steelers  24–19| AT&T Stadium
| Cowboys  17–16
| Limited fans in attendance due to ongoing COVID-19 pandemic. Final start in the series for Ben Roethlisberger.
|-
| 
| TBD
| Acrisure Stadium
|
|
|-

|-
| Regular season
| style="|| Cowboys 9–6
| Steelers 8–7
| 
|-
| Postseason
| style="|| N/A
| N/A
| Super Bowls X, XIII, XXX
|-
| Regular and postseason 
| style="|'''
| Cowboys 9–6 
| Steelers 8–7
| Steelers are 2–1 at neutral site games
|-

References

Dallas Cowboys
Pittsburgh Steelers
National Football League rivalries
Dallas Cowboys rivalries
Pittsburgh Steelers rivalries